The 2009–10 Indiana Pacers season was Indiana's 43rd season as a franchise and 34th season in the NBA.

Key dates
 June 25 - The 2009 NBA Draft took place in New York City.
 July 8 - The free agency period started.

Summary

NBA Draft 2009

Free agency
In July 2009, the Pacers signed nine-year veteran Earl Watson to a one-year contract, and the team also signed three-year veteran Solomon Jones to a two-year contract.

Draft picks

Roster

Regular season

Standings

Record vs. opponents

Game log 

|- align="center"  bgcolor="#ffbbbb"
| 1 || October 28 || @ Atlanta || L |  || Philips Arena17,998 || D. Granger (31) || T. Murphy (10) || T. Murphy (7) || 0–1
|- align="center"  bgcolor="#ffbbbb"
| 2 || October 30 || vs. Miami || L |  || Conseco Fieldhouse18,165 || D. Granger (22) || T. Murphy (13) || L. Head (3)D. Granger (3)E. Watson (3) || 0–2
|-

|- align="center"  bgcolor="#ffbbbb"
| 3 || November 3 || vs. Denver || L |  || Conseco Fieldhouse10,627 || D. Jones (20) || R. Hibbert (12) || L. Head (3) || 0–3
|- align="center"  bgcolor="#ccffcc"
| 4 || November 4 || @ New York || W |  || Madison Square Garden19,273 || D. Granger (21) || R. Hibbert (14) || D. Granger (4) || 1–3
|- align="center"  bgcolor="#ccffcc"
| 5 || November 6 || vs. Washington || W |  || Conseco Fieldhouse14,556 || D. Granger (22) || R. Hibbert (11) || D. Jones (5) || 2–3
|- align="center"  bgcolor="#ccffcc"
| 6 || November 11 || vs. Golden State || W |  || Conseco Fieldhouse10,682 || D. Granger (31) || D. Granger (16) || R. Hibbert (4) || 3–3
|- align="center"  bgcolor="#ccffcc"
| 7 || November 14 || vs. Boston || W 113–104 |  || Conseco Fieldhouse18,165 || D. Granger (29) || B. Rush (8) || E. Watson (7) || 4–3
|- align="center"  bgcolor="#ccffcc"
| 8 || November 17 || @ New Jersey || W 91–83 |  || Izod Center11,332 || D. Granger (22) || R. Hibbert (10) || D. Jones (4)T. Ford (4) || 5–3
|- align="center"  bgcolor="#ffbbbb"
| 9 || November 18 || vs. New York || L 103– 110 || Conseco Fieldhouse12,258 || D. Granger (33) || R. Hibbert (12) || T. Ford (5) || 5–4
|- align="center"  bgcolor="#ffbbbb"
| 10 || November 20 || vs. Cleveland || L 95–105 || Conseco Fieldhouse18,165 || D. Granger (19) || T. Murphy (10) || D. Granger (5) || 5–5
|- align="center"  bgcolor="#ffbbbb"
| 11 || November 22 || @ Charlotte || L 88–104 || TWC Arena14,730 || D. Jones (19) || T. Murphy (8) || E. Watson (5) || 5–6
|- align="center"  bgcolor="#ffbbbb"
| 12 || November 24 || @ Toronto || L 112–123 || Air Canada Centre17,136 || D. Granger (36) || D. Granger (9) || D. Granger (5)T. Murphy (5)E. Watson (5) || 5–7
|- align="center"  bgcolor="#ccffcc"
| 13 || November 25 || vs. L. A. Clippers || W 86–73 || Conseco Fieldhouse12,350 || T. Murphy (18)D. Jones (18) || T. Murphy (11)B. Rush (11) || T. Ford (6) || 6–7
|- align="center"  bgcolor="#ffbbbb"
| 14 || November 27 || vs. Dallas || L 92–113 || Conseco Fieldhouse16,613 || D. Granger (20) || J. Foster (6) || T. Ford (5) || 6–8
|- align="center"  bgcolor="#ffbbbb"
| 15 || November 30 || @ Golden State || L 107–126 || Oracle Arena16,574 || M. Dunleavy (22)D. Granger (22) || T. Murphy (10) || T. Ford (4)J. Foster (4)T. Murphy (4) || 6–9
|-

|- align="center"  bgcolor="#ffbbbb"
| 16 || December 2 || @ Sacramento || L 105–110 || Arco Arena10,021 || D. Granger (33) || J. Foster (18) || T. Murphy (3)J. Foster (3) || 6–10
|- align="center"  bgcolor="#ffbbbb"
| 17 || December 4 || @ Utah || L 87–96 || EnergySolutions Arena19,347 || D. Granger (26) || T. Murphy (10) || M. Dunleavy (4)E. Watson (4) || 6–11
|- align="center"  bgcolor="#ffbbbb"
| 18 || December 5 || @ L. A. Clippers || L 72–88 || Staples Center15,305 || T. Murphy (13) || T. Murphy (9) || E. Watson (9) || 6–12
|- align="center"  bgcolor="#ffbbbb"
| 19 || December 9 || vs. Portland || L 91–102 || Conseco Fieldhouse11,487 || D. Jones (19) ||  T. Hansbrough (11) || T. Ford (5) || 6–13
|- align="center"  bgcolor="#ccffcc"
| 20 || December 11 || vs. New Jersey || W 107–91 || Conseco Fieldhouse12,175 || T. Hansbrough (21) || T. Murphy (12) || T. Ford (5) || 7–13
|- align="center"  bgcolor="#ccffcc"
| 21 || December 12 || @ Washington || W 114–113 || Verizon Center13,172 || T. Murphy (28) || T. Murphy (12) || E. Watson (10) || 8–13
|- align="center"  bgcolor="#ffbbbb"
| 22 || December 14 || @ Orlando || L 98–106 || Amway Arena17,461 || M. Dunleavy (26) || T. Murphy (6)T. Ford (6)T. Hansbrough (6) || T. Ford (7) || 8–14
|- align="center"  bgcolor="#ccffcc"
| 23 || December 16 || vs. Charlotte || W 101–98 || Conseco Fieldhouse11,888 || T. Murphy (26) || T. Murphy (15) || T. Ford (13) || 9–14
|- align="center"  bgcolor="#ffbbbb"
| 24 || December 18 || @ Memphis || L 94–107 || FedEx Forum13,217 || M. Dunleavy (16)T. Ford (16) || E. Watson (8)T. Murphy (8) || T. Murphy (8)D. Jones (3) || 9–15
|- align="center"  bgcolor="#ffbbbb"
| 25 || December 19 || @ San Antonio || L 99–100 || AT&T Center17,075 || T. Murphy (21) || R. Hibbert (7)T. Murphy (7) || T. Ford (5)E. Watson (5) || 9–16
|- align="center"  bgcolor="#ffbbbb"
| 26 || December 21 || vs. Milwaukee || L 81–84 || Conseco Fieldhouse12,836 || R. Hibbert (16) || T. Murphy (13) || T. Ford (5) || 9–17
|- align="center"  bgcolor="#ffbbbb"
| 27 || December 22 || @ Boston || L 94–103 || TD Garden18,624 || T. Murphy (24) || T. Murphy (18) || D. Jones (8) || 9–18
|- align="center"  bgcolor="#ffbbbb"
| 28 || December 26 || vs. Atlanta || L 98–110 || Conseco Fieldhouse15,281 || L. Head (19)T. Hansbrough (19)T. Murphy (19) || T. Murphy (12) || T. Ford (9) || 9–19
|- align="center"  bgcolor="#ffbbbb"
| 29 || December 27 || @ Miami || L 80–114 || American Airlines Arena19,600 || T. Murphy (16) || T. Hansbrough (10) ||  T. Ford (4) || 9–20
|- align="center"  bgcolor="#ffbbbb"
| 30 || December 29 || @ Chicago || L 95–104 || United Center21,887 || R. Hibbert (17) || R. Hibbert (6) || D. Jones (7) || 9–21
|- align="center"  bgcolor="#ffbbbb"
| 31 || December 30 || vs. Memphis || L 110–121 || Conseco Fieldhouse14,741 || L. Head (30) || R. Hibbert (13) || E. Watson (6) || 9–22
|-

|- align="center"  bgcolor="#ccffcc"
| 32 || January 2 || vs. Minnesota || W 122–111 || Conseco Fieldhouse12,685 || L. Head (21)R. Hibbert (21) || M. Dunleavy (8)J. McRoberts (8) || E. Watson (9) || 10–22
|- align="center"  bgcolor="#ffbbbb"
| 33 || January 3 || @ New York || L 89–132 || Madison Square Garden19,763 || L. Head (18) || B. Rush (8) || R. Hibbert (7) || 10–23
|- align="center"  bgcolor="#ccffcc"
| 34 || January 5 || vs. Orlando || W 97–90 || Conseco Fieldhouse11,119 || R. Hibbert (26) || M. Dunleavy (9) || E. Watson (4) || 11–23
|- align="center"  bgcolor="#ffbbbb"
| 35 || January 8 || @ Minnesota || L 109-116  || Target Center13,111 || T. Murphy (21) || 4 players (6) || E. Watson (7)A.J. Price (7) || 11-24
|- align="center"  bgcolor="#ffbbbb"
| 36 || January 9 || @ Oklahoma City || L |  || Ford Center18,203 || D. Granger (25) || T. Murphy (15) || E. Watson (9) || 11-25
|- align="center"  bgcolor="#ccffcc"
| 37 || January 11 || vs. Toronto || W 105-101 || Conseco Fieldhouse11,039 || D. Granger (23) || T. Murphy (16) || E. Watson (8) || 12-25
|- align="center"  bgcolor="#ccffcc"
| 38 || January 13 || vs. Phoenix || W 122-114 || Conseco Fieldhouse10,858 || D. Granger (33) || T. Murphy (14) || E. Watson (9) || 13-25
|- align="center"  bgcolor="#ccffcc"
| 39 || January 15 || @ New Jersey || W 121-105 || Izod Center13,656 || D. Granger (28) || T. Murphy (14) || 3 players (5) || 14-25
|- align="center"  bgcolor="#ffbbbb"
| 40 || January 16 || vs. New Orleans || L 96-101 || Conseco Fieldhouse13,376 || R. Hibbert (27) || R. Hibbert (10) || E. Watson (7) || 14-26
|- align="center"  bgcolor="#ffbbbb"
| 41 || January 19 || @ Miami || L 83-113 || American Airlines Center14,986 || B. Rush (17) || T. Murphy (12) || D. Jones (5) || 14-27
|- align="center"  bgcolor="#ffbbbb"
| 42 || January 20 || @ Orlando || L 98-109 || Amway Arena17,461 || D. Granger (25) || T. Murphy (10) || E. Watson (4) || 14-28
|- align="center"  bgcolor="#ccffcc"
| 43 || January 22 || @ Detroit || W 105-93 || The Palace of Auburn Hills15,388 || D. Granger (25) || T. Murphy (11) || E. Watson (6) || 15-28
|- align="center"  bgcolor="#ffbbbb"
| 44 || January 23 || vs. Philadelphia || L 97-107 || Conseco Fieldhouse16,074 || D. Granger (22) || T. Murphy (12) || 5 players (3) || 15-29
|- align="center"  bgcolor="#ccffcc"
| 45 || January 25 || @ Philadelphia || W 109-98 || Wachovia Center10,579 || D. Granger (26) || T. Murphy (12) || T. Murphy (7) || 16-29
|- align="center"  bgcolor="#ffbbbb"
| 46 || January 27 || vs. L. A. Lakers || L 96-118 || Conseco Fieldhouse18,165 || R. Hibbert (21) || B. Rush (11) || E. Watson (7) || 16-30
|- align="center"  bgcolor="#ffbbbb"
| 47 || January 29 || vs. Cleveland || L 73-94 || Conseco Fieldhouse18,165 || D. Granger (13) || D. Granger (10) || D. Granger (5) || 16-31
|- align="center"  bgcolor="#ffbbbb"
| 48 || January 31 || @ Toronto || L 102-117 || Air Canada Centre16,715 || L. Head (15) || T. Murphy (8) || E. Watson (6) || 16-32
|-

|- align="center"  bgcolor="#ccffcc"
| 49 || February 2 || vs. Toronto || W 130-115 || Conseco Fieldhouse11,191 || D. Granger (23) || T. Murphy (14) || E. Watson (11) || 17-32
|- align="center"  bgcolor="#ccffcc"
| 50 || February 5 || vs. Detroit || W 107-83 || Conseco Fieldhouse14,832 || D. Granger (25) || R. Hibbert (11) || B. Rush (5)T.J. Ford (5) || 18-32
|- align="center"  bgcolor="#ffbbbb"
| 51 || February 6 || @ Milwaukee || L 81-93 || Bradley Center18,717 || T. Ford (20) || T. Murphy (11) || D. Granger (5) || 18-33
|- align="center"  bgcolor="#ffbbbb"
| 52 || February 9 || vs. Chicago || L 101-109 || Conseco Fieldhouse12,945 || D. Granger (27) || T. Murphy (16) || E. Watson (6) || 18-34 
|- align="center"  bgcolor="#ffbbbb"
| 53 || February 17 || vs. San Antonio || L 87-90 || Conseco Fieldhouse14,947 || D. Granger (23) || T. Murphy (16) || E. Watson (8) || 18-35 
|- align="center"  bgcolor="#ffbbbb"
| 54 || February 19 || @ New Orleans || L 101-107 || New Orleans Arena15,644 || D. Granger (29) || T. Murphy (7) || T. Ford (6) || 18-36
|- align="center"  bgcolor="#ccffcc"
| 55 || February 20 || @ Houston || W 125-115 || Toyota Center16,550 || D. Granger (36) || T. Murphy (12) || D. Granger (4)T. Murphy (4) || 19-36
|- align="center"  bgcolor="#ffbbbb"
| 56 || February 22 || @ Dallas || L 82-91 || American Airlines Center19,585 || T. Ford (14) || T. Murphy (11) || 5 players (3) || 19-37
|- align="center"  bgcolor="#ffbbbb"
| 57 || February 24 || @ Chicago || L 110-120 || United Center20,363 || B. Rush (21) || D. Granger (7)B. Rush (7) || D. Granger (5) || 19-38
|- align="center"  bgcolor="#ffbbbb"
| 58 || February 25 || vs. Milwaukee || L 110-112 || Conseco Fieldhouse14,116 || D. Granger (21) || E. Watson (8) || E. Watson (5)T. Ford (5) || 19-39
|- align="center"  bgcolor="#ccffcc"
| 59 || February 27 || vs. Chicago || W 100-90 || Conseco Fieldhouse18,165 || D. Granger (30) || D. Granger (8) || T. Ford (7) || 20-39
|-

|- align="center"  bgcolor="#ffbbbb"
| 60 || March 2 || @ L. A. Lakers || L 99-122 || Staples Center18,997 || T. Murphy (17) || T. Murphy (13) || E. Watson (10) || 20-40
|- align="center"  bgcolor="#ffbbbb"
| 61 || March 3 || @ Portland || L 79-102 || Rose Garden Arena20,623 || D. Granger (30) || B. Rush (8) || T. Ford (5) || 20-41
|- align="center"  bgcolor="#ffbbbb"
| 62 || March 5 || @ Denver || L 114-122 || Pepsi Center19,155 || D. Granger (32) || T. Murphy (9) || T. Ford (4)J. McRoberts (4) || 20-42
|- align="center"  bgcolor="#ffbbbb"
| 63 || March 6 || @ Phoenix || L 105-113 || US Airways Center18,180 || D. Granger (24) || T. Murphy (16) || T. Ford (5) || 20-43
|- align="center"  bgcolor="#ccffcc"
| 64 || March 9 || vs. Philadelphia || W 107-96 || Conseco Fieldhouse11,535 || D. Jones (25) || R. Hibbert (11) || E. Watson (10) || 21-43
|- align="center"  bgcolor="#ffbbbb"
| 65 || March 12 || @ Boston || L 103-122 || TD Garden18,624 || R. Hibbert (23) || T. Murphy (9) || B. Rush (6)E. Watson (6) || 21-44
|- align="center"  bgcolor="#ffbbbb"
| 66 || March 14 || @ Milwaukee || L 94-98 || Bradley Center15,107 || D. Granger (29) || T. Murphy (12) || 4 players (3) || 21-45
|- align="center"  bgcolor="#ccffcc"
| 67 || March 16 || vs. Charlotte || W 99-94 || Conseco Fieldhouse10,850 || D. Granger (26) || T. Murphy (13) || T. Murphy (5) || 22-45
|- align="center"  bgcolor="#ffbbbb"
| 68 || March 17 || @ Cleveland || L 94-99 || Quicken Loans Arena20,562 || R. Hibbert (20) || T. Murphy (15) || D. Jones (6)A. Price (6) || 22-46
|- align="center"  bgcolor="#ccffcc"
| 69 || March 19 || vs. Detroit || W 106-102 || Conseco Fieldhouse13,583 || D. Granger (29) || T. Murphy (8) || E. Watson (11) || 23-46
|- align="center"  bgcolor="#ccffcc"
| 70 || March 21 || vs. Oklahoma City || W 121-101 || Conseco Fieldhouse14,701 || D. Granger (32) || T. Murphy (13) || E. Watson (8) || 24-46
|- align="center"  bgcolor="#ccffcc"
| 71 || March 23 || @ Detroit || W 98-83 || The Palace of Auburn Hills17,109 || D. Granger (32) || T. Murphy (12) || E. Watson (13) || 25-46
|- align="center"  bgcolor="#ccffcc"
| 72 || March 24 || vs. Washington || W 99-82 || Conseco Fieldhouse12,504 || D. Granger (31) || T. Murphy (19) || E. Watson (7) || 26-46
|- align="center"  bgcolor="#ccffcc"
| 73 || March 26 || vs. Utah || W 122-106 || Conseco Fieldhouse15,463 || D. Granger (44) || T. Murphy (9) || R. Hibbert (6)E. Watson (6) || 27-46
|- align="center"  bgcolor="#ffbbbb"
| 74 || March 28 || @ Atlanta || L 84-94 || Philips Arena16,646 || T. Murphy (21) || T. Murphy (14) || E. Watson (13) || 27-47
|- align="center"  bgcolor="#ccffcc"
| 75 || March 30 || vs. Sacramento || W 102-95 || Conseco Fieldhouse13,339 || D. Granger (33) || T. Murphy (13) || B. Rush (5)E. Watson (5) || 28-47
|-

|- align="center"  bgcolor="#ffbbbb"
| 76 || April 2 || vs. Miami || L 96-105 (OT) || Conseco Fieldhouse16,787 || T. Murphy (29) || T. Murphy (15) || E. Watson (5) || 28-48
|- align="center"  bgcolor="#ccffcc"
| 77 || April 4 || vs. Houston || W 133-102 || Conseco Fieldhouse14,201|| R. Hibbert (20) || T. Murphy (12)J. McRoberts (12) || R. Hibbert (7) || 29-48
|- align="center"  bgcolor="#ccffcc"
| 78 || April 7 || vs. New York || W 113-105 || Conseco Fieldhouse15,330 || D. Granger (33) || T. Murphy (12) || E. Watson (6) || 30-48
|- align="center"  bgcolor="#ccffcc"
| 79 || April 9 || @ Cleveland || W 116-113 || Quicken Loans Arena20,562 || D. Granger (36) || T. Murphy (11) || E. Watson (10) || 31-48
|- align="center"  bgcolor="#ccffcc"
| 80 || April 10 || vs. New Jersey || W 115-102 || Conseco Fieldhouse18,165 || T. Murphy (25) || T. Murphy (9) || E. Watson (6) || 32-48
|- align="center"  bgcolor="#ffbbbb"
| 81 || April 12 || vs. Orlando || L 98-118 || Conseco Fieldhouse18,165 || A. Price (19) || B. Rush (12) || E. Watson (4)R. Hibbert (4)A. Price (4) || 32-49
|- align="center"  bgcolor="#ffbbbb"
| 82 || April 14 || @ Washington || L 97-98 || Verizon Center16,126 || R. Hibbert (29) || T. Murphy (9)D. Granger (9) || J. McRoberts (4) || 32-50
|-

Player statistics

Regular season

|-
| 
| 67 || 15 || 22.2 || .410 || .318 || .842 || 3.5 || 1.5 || .6 || .2 || 9.9
|-
| 
| 47 || 32 || 25.3 || .445 || .160 || .770 || 3.2 || 3.8 || .9 || .2 || 10.3
|-
| 
| 16 || 3 || 15.9 || .478 || .000 || .556 || 5.1 || 1.3 || .2 || .2 || 3.1
|-
| 
| 62 || 62 || style=";"| 36.7 || .428 || .361 || style=";"| .848 || 5.5 || 2.8 || style=";"| 1.5 || .8 || style=";"| 24.1
|-
| 
| 29 || 1 || 17.6 || .360 || .000 || .743 || 4.8 || 1.0 || .6 || .3 || 8.5
|-
| 
| 47 || 10 || 17.3 || .437 || .352 || .828 || 1.7 || 1.5 || .4 || .2 || 7.6
|-
| 
| 81 || style=";"| 69 || 25.1 || .495 || style=";"| .500 || .754 || 5.7 || 2.0 || .4 || style=";"| 1.6 || 11.7
|-
| 
| 76 || 26 || 24.9 || .461 || .125 || .770 || 3.0 || 2.0 || .5 || .5 || 10.2
|-
| 
| 52 || 2 || 13.0 || .443 || .000 || .718 || 2.8 || .6 || .3 || .7 || 4.0
|-
| 
| 42 || 3 || 12.5 || style=";"| .521 || .348 || .500 || 3.0 || 1.0 || .4 || .4 || 4.3
|-
| 
| 72 || style=";"| 69 || 32.6 || .472 || .384 || .798 || style=";"| 10.2 || 2.1 || 1.0 || .5 || 14.6
|-
| 
| 56 || 2 || 15.4 || .410 || .345 || .800 || 1.6 || 1.9 || .6 || .0 || 7.3
|-
| 
| style=";"| 82 || 64 || 30.4 || .423 || .411 || .629 || 4.2 || 1.4 || .7 || .8 || 9.4
|-
| 
| 79 || 52 || 29.4 || .426 || .288 || .710 || 3.0 || style=";"| 5.1 || 1.3 || .2 || 7.8
|}

References

Indiana Pacers seasons
Indiana
Pace
Pace